Graham George Mexted (3 February 1927 – 9 March 2009) was a New Zealand rugby union player. Playing in the position of number 8, Mexted represented Wellington at a provincial level, and was a member of the New Zealand national side, the All Blacks. He represented New Zealand in six international matches, one of them at full test level, from 1950 to 1951. His son Murray Mexted was also an All Black. Graham Mexted died at his home in Tawa, Wellington, on 9 March 2009 aged 82.

References

External links

1927 births
2009 deaths
People from Greytown, New Zealand
People educated at Wellington College (New Zealand)
New Zealand international rugby union players
New Zealand rugby union players
Wellington rugby union players
Rugby union number eights
20th-century New Zealand businesspeople
Rugby union players from the Wellington Region